The VT-28 "Rangers" is a U.S. Navy primary flight training squadron based at Naval Air Station Corpus Christi, Texas.

History

VT-28 was initially established as Advanced Training Unit 611 (ATU-611). The Rangers began as an advanced multi-engine training squadron flying the S2F-1T, a training variant of the Grumman S-2 Tracker. On May 1, 1960 ATU-611 was redesignated VT-28 and in September 1962 its aircraft was redesignated the TS-2A in accordance with the 1962 United States Tri-Service aircraft designation system.

After decades of use and the designation of thousands of Naval Aviators, the TS-2A was replaced with the T-44A Pegasus twin-engine turboprop trainer in 1979. VT-28 continued training advanced multi-engine aviators until 1990 when the Chief of Naval Air Training (CNATRA) reassigned the squadron to be responsible for training instructors and updating training syllabi for the T-44A and T-34C Turbo Mentor. Three years later, CNATRA again reassigned VT-28, this time to be the Navy's fifth primary training squadron flying the T-34C Turbo Mentor. In 2013 the squadron began its transition from the T-34C to the Navy's newest primary flight trainer, the Beechcraft T-6B Texan II

Aircraft
 S2F-1T / TS-2A Tracker - Advanced multi-engine (1960-1979)
 T-44A King Air - Advanced multi-engine (1979-1993)
 T-34C Turbo Mentor - Primary flight training (1990-2013)
 T-6B Texan II - Primary flight training (2013 to present)

See also
 List of United States Navy aircraft squadrons
 List of inactive United States Navy aircraft squadrons

References

Training squadrons of the United States Navy